The 2011–2012 Liga EBA season is the 18th edition of the Liga EBA. This is the fourth division of Spanish basketball. Four teams will be promoted to LEB Plata. The regular season (and all games before the final playoffs) will start on September 18, 2011, and will finish on April 28, 2012.

Format

Regular season
Teams are divided in five groups by geographical criteria. Group A is also divided in two:
Sub-group A-A: Cantabria, Basque Country, La Rioja and Castile and León (except teams from Zamora).
Sub-group A-B: Galicia, Asturias and Zamora.
Group B: Community of Madrid, Castile-La Mancha and Canary Islands.
Group C: Catalonia and Aragón.
Group D: Andalusia, Extremadura and Melilla.
Group E: Valencian Community, Region of Murcia and Balearic Islands.

Final play-off
The three best teams of each group plus a fourth qualified decided with special criteria will play a double leg play-off. From these 16 teams, only four will be promoted to LEB Plata.

The first round games will be played on May 13 and 20, 2012; the second and last round on May 27 and June 3, 2012.

Regular season tables

Group A

Sub group A-A

Sub group A-B

Second round playoffs
The three first qualified teams of each group played against each other a two-legged tie. The winners of the games join the Final Stage playoffs.  Team #1 played the second game at home.

Group A final standings
After the regular season of the groups A-A and A-B, the team qualified in the same position play a double game play-off to determine their final position in the table.

Group B

Group C

Group D

Group E

Final playoffs
16 teams will join the Final play-offs. Four of them will promote to LEB Plata.

Playoffs table

References and notes

Competition rules 
Promotion and relegation rules to 1ª División

External links
Liga EBA in FEB.es (Spanish)

Liga EBA seasons
EBA